Mabutsane is a Botswana village located in the Southern district, subdistrict of Ngwaketse West. According to the 2011 census, the village has 2,386 inhabitants.

Location 

In the territory of the village there are the following 23 locations:

 Bokhutlo of 11 inhabitants,
 Bokspan of 12 inhabitants,
 Ditlhako of 11 inhabitants,
 Gasekhukhu ,
 Ghia of 7 inhabitants,
 hantse ,
 Kabana of 3 inhabitants,
 Kenna of 10 inhabitants,
 Khawa ,
 Lokatsane ,
 Lwale ,
 Makalamabedi of 15 inhabitants,
 Marapalalo ,
 Matimela Camp of 4 inhabitants,
 Metlhaba ya Matlatlagwe of 3 inhabitants,
 Metlhabeng ,
 Motlops of 2 inhabitants,
 Nankhwane of 20 inhabitants,
 Nyetse ,
 Palamaokuwe of 19 inhabitants,
 Sekgwannabatho of 4 inhabitants,
 Sekgwasentsho of 7 inhabitants,
 Tlhatswe of 8 inhabitants

References 

Southern District (Botswana)
Villages in Botswana